Ilias Ioannou (born 29 October 1979) is a Greek former professional footballer who played as a forward.

Career
Ioannou began his playing career by signing with Panionios F.C. in July 1998.

References

External links
Myplayer.gr

1979 births
Living people
Association football forwards
Super League Greece players
Panionios F.C. players
A.O. Kerkyra players
Olympiacos Volos F.C. players
Kavala F.C. players
Asteras Tripolis F.C. players
Panetolikos F.C. players
Veria F.C. players
Footballers from Athens
Greek footballers